Capileira is the highest and most northerly of the three villages in the gorge of the Poqueira river in the La Alpujarra district of the province of Granada, in Spain. It is located at latitude 36° 57' N and longitude 3° 21' W, about 1 km north of Bubión. Its altitude is officially recorded as 1436 metres, though there is a considerable altitude difference between the oldest part of the village, which is at the lower, southern end, and the highest part, where tourist-oriented development is currently concentrated. The area of the municipality is 57 km².

Although the Sierra Nevada Highway runs through Capileira and out across the Sierra Nevada towards the city of Granada, motor traffic is no longer permitted to continue across the mountains; Capileira is therefore the highest village that public traffic can reach, although you can continue to a car park where the national park begins and the road is barred to normal traffic. The national park runs a limited bus service on the now-closed road (reservations handled by office in the village) in summer. A track leads northwards from the village to the abandoned settlement of La Cebadilla, built to house the workers who developed the hydro-electric installation at the upper end of the Poqueira Gorge.

Capileira has developed a significant tourist trade, acting as a centre for walking and for accessing the mountains especially Mulhacén, generally treated as a two-day climb from Capileira with an overnight stop at a mountain refuge en route. A bus route connects the village to Granada (via Lanjarón and Órgiva) and Alcútar (via Trevélez and Juviles);  there were 3 services per day in each direction. The village has good facilities for visitors including a number of restaurants, a market on Saturdays, hotels and apartment blocks, but retains a typical Alpujarran character especially away from the main road. Its population in 2005 was recorded as 582 people, of whom 35 did not have Spanish nationality, most of them being citizens of other European Union countries. The village has a primary school but no secondary school.

References

External links 
Capileira - Sistema de Información Multiterritorial de Andalucía
Holiday guide to Capileira and La Alpujarra, Walks, Holiday Accommodation & Travel Information

Municipalities in the Province of Granada